Ellie Leigh Mason (born 16 February 1996) is a professional footballer who plays as a midfielder for Lewes of the FA Women's Championship. Born in England, she represents Northern Ireland at international level.

Club career
Mason began her career in Watford's youth teams. After moving on to Chelsea, she appeared 23 times for the club's development team, scoring six goals. Nineteen-year-old Mason returned to Watford in April 2015, after four years with Chelsea. In 2015, she was Watford's top-goalscorer with five goals and won the club's Goal of the Season award for a strike against Aston Villa. She scored three goals in 14 appearances in the 2016 season, then signed for Millwall Lionesses in February 2017.

After spending the FA WSL Spring Series and 2017–18 season with Millwall Lionesses, Mason signed a full-time professional contract with Yeovil Town in August 2018.

At Yeovil Town Mason converted to playing as a defender, but the club finished a distant last in the 2018–19 FA WSL after a series of hurtful on-field drubbings and a 10-point penalty imposed for insolvency. Yeovil were then kicked out of the top two Leagues when The FA rejected their purported business plan.

Mason then joined new FA Women's Championship club London City Lionesses, where she was appointed club captain. However, after being released by the club in 2021, she signed for Lewes on 28 July.

International career
Mason was eligible to represent England, Gibraltar and Northern Ireland at international level. She received her first international callup for Gibraltar in February 2022. In August 2022, she was called up to the Northern Ireland after switching her international allegiance from Gibraltar.

Career statistics

International

References

External links

1996 births
Living people
Women's association footballers from Northern Ireland
Women's association football midfielders
Northern Ireland women's international footballers
Gibraltarian women's footballers
Gibraltar women's international footballers
Gibraltarian people of British descent
British people of Northern Ireland descent
English women's footballers
Watford F.C. Women players
Chelsea F.C. Women players
Yeovil Town L.F.C. players
Millwall Lionesses L.F.C. players
London City Lionesses players
Lewes F.C. Women players
Women's Super League players
English people of Northern Ireland descent